Robert Grier Stephens Jr. (August 14, 1913 – February 20, 2003) was a United States representative from Georgia.

Stephens was born in Atlanta, Georgia. He was a great-great nephew of Alexander Stephens, a grandson of Clement Anselm Evans and a distant cousin of 19th-century U.S. Supreme Court Justice Robert Cooper Grier. Robert Stephens graduated from Boys High School in 1931. He attended the University of Georgia at Athens and obtained a Bachelor of Arts in 1935, a Master of Arts in 1937, and a bachelor of laws ([LL.B.) in 1941. During his education at the University if Georgia, he attended the University of Hamburg in Germany in 1935 and 1936.

He served in the United States Army from September 1941 through March 1946 attaining the rank of lieutenant colonel. While in the army, he was stationed in the United States and in Germany. During the Nuremberg trials following World War II, Stephens served on the staff of Robert H. Jackson, the United States Supreme Court Justice who served as the chief prosecutor for the United States during the trials. After his army service, he joined the University of Georgia faculty. He also maintained a private law practice in Athens in addition to serving as city attorney.

In 1951, Stephens was elected to the Georgia Senate and was re-elected through 1953, when he was elected to the Georgia House of Representatives. He served in the state House through 1959. He was elected in 1960 as a Democrat representing Georgia's 10th congressional district in the 87th United States Congress, and won re-election to seven additional terms in that body until he chose not to run for re-election in 1976. During his congressional service, Stephens served as a delegate to the 1964 Democratic National Convention.  He died on February 20, 2003, in Athens and was buried in that city's Oconee Hill Cemetery.

References

External links
Robert Grier Stephens Jr. Collection from 1961 to 1976, Russell Library for Political Research and Studies, University of Georgia, Athens, Georgia

1913 births
2003 deaths
United States Army officers
Democratic Party members of the Georgia House of Representatives
Democratic Party Georgia (U.S. state) state senators
University of Georgia alumni
University of Georgia faculty
Politicians from Atlanta
Military personnel from Georgia (U.S. state)
Democratic Party members of the United States House of Representatives from Georgia (U.S. state)
20th-century American politicians